Crisis is a 1946 Swedish film directed and written by Ingmar Bergman. The film was Bergman's first feature as director and he also wrote the screenplay, which is based on the Danish radio play Moderhjertet (translated as The Mother Animal, A Mother's Heart, The Mother Creature, and The Maternal Instinct) by Leck Fischer.

Plot
The story follows a young girl living a quiet life in a small town with her foster mother.  Nelly is an innocent 18-year-old becoming increasingly aware of the effect that her beauty has on the men of her little Swedish village. Ingeborg is a respectably dour woman who teaches piano to village youth and runs a rooming house, and has undoubtedly sacrificed much for the sake of her foster daughter. With Nelly on the verge of womanhood and Ingeborg in failing health, Miss Jenny returns in her fancy hat, painted nails and trampy air of sophistication to take her long-abandoned daughter away to sample the indulgent fruits of urban life.
  
Jenny has had a rough past, involving prostitution and other scandals, but now owns a beauty salon which affords her a few comforts in life, material and otherwise. Among them is a dapper mustachioed gentleman acquaintance named Jack, who follows Jenny to the village as an uninvited guest. Jenny's purpose in coming was to meet up with Nelly at a charity ball, and when Jack learns about the event he's more than happy to inject more liveliness into the affair than the village elders had in mind.  Nelly and Jack leave the ball, which has descended into chaos due to Jack's antics, and kiss passionately at the lakeside at night. Nelly's admirer, Ulf, who rents a room from Ingeborg, humiliates Jack and tosses him off a dock into the lake.

Nelly, conflicted about leaving Ingeborg (her beloved "Mutti"), decides after the scandal to leave with Jenny and Jack to go to the city. Ingeborg and Ulf are saddened, but Ingeborg tells him they must wait while Nelly goes through the experience. While in the city, tensions rise, and Nelly must decide whether to remain there or to return to the small town.

Cast
(in alphabetical order)

References

External links

1946 films
Films directed by Ingmar Bergman
Films with screenplays by Ingmar Bergman
1940s Swedish-language films
Swedish black-and-white films
1946 drama films
Swedish drama films
1946 directorial debut films
1940s Swedish films